Meerabai Not Out, based on cricket, is a 2008 Hindi Bollywood film that stars Mahesh Manjrekar, Mandira Bedi, Eijaz Khan and Anupam Kher. It is a Pritish Nandy Communications presented movie, directed by Chandrakant Kulkarni.

Mandira Bedi plays a deglam role of a cricket-crazy fan. Anil Kumble is also seen for a small role in the film.

The film was released in India on 5 December 2008.

Cast
 Anupam Kher  ...  Dr. Awasthi  
  Mahesh Manjrekar  ...  Manoj Anant Achrekar  
  Mandira Bedi  ...  Meera A. Achrekar  
  Eijaz Khan  ...  Dr. Arjun Awasthi  
  Vandana Gupte  ...  Mrs. Achrekar / Aai  
  Prateeksha Lonkar  ...  Neelima M. Achrekar  
  Anil Kumble  ...  Himself

Plot
Meera Achrekar lives a middle-classed lifestyle in a Shivaji Park Chawl, along with her widowed mother; brother Manoj, his wife, Neelima, and their son, Mayank. After the passing of their father, Anant, Manoj, who was just 18 at that time, took over the financial reins of this family, while she, herself, got employed as a Maths Teacher with Vishwa-Prem Vidyalaya, and heads the 'Meera XI' cricket team in the colony. Her mother and Manoj are on the look-out for a suitable groom, but her obsession with cricket along with the 'bahenji' bespectacled looks turn to her disadvantage. Things start to look up after she dramatically meets with heart specialist Dr. Arjun Awasthi, who lives in a mansion with his widower dentist father. The two families meet, and decide to get the couple married. On the day of the formal engagement, however, things spiral out of control when Meera does not show up.

Soundtrack

The soundtrack was composed by Sandesh Shandilya and Sukhwinder Singh. The lyrics were penned by Irfan Siddique, R. N. Dubey and Soumik Sen

References

External links
 

Download Mp3 and Rm Songs
Get the lyrics of all the Bollywood songs

2008 films
Films about cricket in India
2000s Hindi-language films
Films directed by Chandrakant Kulkarni
Sony Pictures films
Columbia Pictures films
Sony Pictures Networks India films